There are over 20,000 Grade II* listed buildings in England. This article comprises a list of these buildings in the county of Herefordshire.

List

|}

See also
Grade I listed buildings in Herefordshire

References

External links

Herefordshire2
 
Lists of listed buildings in Herefordshire